This list of listed buildings in Nørrebro lists listed buildings and structures in the Nørrebro district of Copenhagen, Denmark.

List

References

Listed buildings and structures in Copenhagen
Nørrebro